The Grindau is an  right-hand tributary of the River Leine in Lower Saxony (Germany).

Course 

See also
List of rivers of Lower Saxony

References

Rivers of Lower Saxony
Rivers of Germany